Cadmos may refer to:

 Cadmos or Kadmos or Cadmus, a Phoenician prince in Greek mythology
 CADMOS (cable system), a submarine telecommunications cable system in the Mediterranean Sea linking Cyprus and Lebanon